Kenny Loggins Alive is the first live album by American singer-songwriter Kenny Loggins. Released in 1980, it contains material from Loggins' three previous solo albums, as well as a previously unreleased song "All Alone Tonight", "I'm Alright" (the theme from Caddyshack) and a cover of The Beatles "Here There and Everywhere" (Loggins is known to be a Beatles fan). A movie recording of the same title is available with different songs.

Audio Track listing

Disc one
 "I Believe in Love" – 4:09
 "Whenever I Call You 'Friend'" – 5:08
 "Wait a Little While" – 4:18
 "Why Do People Lie" – 6:47
 "What a Fool Believes" – 3:53
 "Junkanoo Holiday (Fallin'-Flyin')" – 5:03
 "I'm Alright" – 5:09
 "Celebrate Me Home" – 9:50

Disc two
 "You Don't Know Me" – 5:03
 "Now and Then" – 4:29
 "All Alone Tonight" – 3:05
 "Here, There and Everywhere" – 3:02
 "Angelique" – 7:59
 "Love Has Come of Age" – 4:03
 "This Is It" – 4:14
 "Down 'N' Dirty" – 6:20
 "Easy Driver" – 3:55
 "Keep the Fire" – 5:46

Video track listing
 "All Alone Tonight"
 "I Believe in Love"
 "Love Has Come of Age"
 "Lady Luck"
 "Angry Eyes"
 "I'm Alright"
 "House at Pooh Corner"
 "Danny's Song"
 "Junkanoo Holiday"
 "Celebrate Me Home"
 "Mr. Night"
 "This Is It"
 "Keep the Fire"

Charts

Personnel 
 Kenny Loggins – lead vocals, guitars
 Mike Hamilton – guitars, backing vocals
 Brian Mann – keyboards, backing vocals
 George Hawkins – bass, backing vocals
 Tris Imboden – drums, backing vocals
 Vince Denham – percussion, horns, woodwinds, bass clarinet, backing vocals
 Jon Clarke – percussion, horns, woodwinds, double-reeds, backing vocals

Guest musicians
 Mark Wittenberg – guitar on "I'm Alright"
 Steve Wood – vocals on "Keep the Fire"
 Albhy Galuten – string arrangements on "Here There and Everywhere"

Production 
 Kenny Loggins – producer 
 Bruce Botnick – producer, recording
 Mark Ettel – engineer 
 Jay Kaufman –  engineer 
 Rik Pekkonen – engineer
 Don Hamilton – photography 
 Hiro Ito – photography

References 

Kenny Loggins albums
1980 live albums
Albums produced by Bruce Botnick
Columbia Records live albums